Ducos is a town and commune in the French overseas department and region, and island of Martinique. It is where the prison is located.

It was called "Trou-au-chat" until 1855, and was renamed after the French politician Théodore Ducos. Its inhabitants are Ducossais.

Population

References

External links

Communes of Martinique
Populated places in Martinique